The Progressive Party (colloquially known as "The Progressives") is a political party in Trinidad and Tobago. The party was founded on June 16, 2019 by former independent senator Nikoli Edwards to contest the 2020 Trinidad and Tobago general election. The Progressives currently do not hold any seats in the House of Representatives, Regional municipalities, Regional corporations or in the Tobago House of Assembly.

History 
The Progressive Party held its first General Meeting in San Fernando, Trinidad and Tobago on December 15, 2019. At that meeting, the party's constitution was ratified, and six of the seven members of the Board of Directors were appointed. The Board of Directors will serve until the Party General Assembly of 2021. In his keynote address, Party Leader Nikoli Edwards outlined his party's policies and vision for Trinidad and Tobago, stating that Trinidad could not achieve progress under the two leading parties in Trinidad, the United National Congress (UNC) and the ruling People's National Movement (PNM).

At the first General Meeting, Edwards made the declaration that he will be contesting the constituency of San Fernando West which is currently represented by Faris Al-Rawi, Attorney General of Trinidad and Tobago.

List of Political Leaders 
The political leaders of the Progressive Party have been as follows (any acting leaders indicated in italics):

Key:

    

PM: Prime Minister

LO: Leader of the Opposition

Electoral history

House of Representatives

Party Leadership

Political Positions 
The Progressives identify with progressivism, as well as the centre-left. The party believes in maintaining a small to moderately-sized government that focuses on helping citizens to realise their fullest potential in a reasonably regulated environment.

References

External links
 Progressive Party

Political parties in Trinidad and Tobago
Political parties established in 2019
Socialism in Trinidad and Tobago
Social liberal parties